"Black Barbies" is a song by rapper Nicki Minaj and producer Mike Will Made It. It is a remix of the song "Black Beatles", which was originally produced by Mike Will Made It and performed by Rae Sremmurd featuring Gucci Mane. An unmixed version of the song was initially released to SoundCloud by Minaj on November 15, 2016. "Black Barbies" was later mixed and released officially for digital purchase on November 30, 2016.

Rolling Stones Rob Sheffield ranked the single 49 on his list of the 50 best songs of the year.

The song later would become viral on the video sharing app TikTok in June 2021, with people (mostly black women) lip syncing the lyrics, while looking at the camera.

Charts

References 

2016 songs
Nicki Minaj songs
Song recordings produced by Mike Will Made It
Songs written by Mike Will Made It
Songs written by Gucci Mane
Songs written by Nicki Minaj
Interscope Records singles
Songs written by Swae Lee
Songs written by Slim Jxmmi